Michel Bettenfeld (29 July 1853 – 13 September 1927) was a French fencer. He competed in the men's masters foil event at the 1900 Summer Olympics.

References

External links
 

1853 births
1927 deaths
French male foil fencers
Olympic fencers of France
Fencers at the 1900 Summer Olympics
Sportspeople from Moselle (department)